State Road 142 (NM 142) is a  state highway in the US state of New Mexico. NM 142's southern terminus is at NM 52 east of Cuchillo, and the northern terminus is at the end of state maintenance by Monticello.

Major intersections

See also

References

142
Transportation in Sierra County, New Mexico